Can't Stop Won't Stop is the debut studio album by American rock band The Maine. It was released on July 8, 2008 through Fearless Records. The album debuted at No. 40 on the Billboard 200 and sold 12,000 copies first week.

Background and production
The Maine formed in January 2007, consisting of John O'Callaghan on vocals, Kennedy Brock and Jared Monaco on guitar, Garrett Nickelsen on bass and Pat Kirch on drums. In November of that year, the group signed to independent label Fearless Records. Nickelsen called Fearless Records "a great label" and "really supportive." The following month, the group released The Way We Talk EP through the label. O'Callaghan said the EP showcased how the group was "transitioning musically," as well as demonstrating their "new attitude toward writing."

Pre-production for their debut album was held at The Swing House in Hollywood, California. In December 2007, the band announced plans to tour with Number One Gun the following month. However, by the end of December, the group had cancelled the touring plans and announced that they would record their debut album instead. Recording started on January 14, 2008 and continued into February. Sessions were held at The Lair in Los Angeles, California, with producer and engineer Matt Squire. "Count 'em, One, Two, Three" was re-recorded for the album; the original version appears on the Stay Up, Get Down EP. Squire mixed "We All Roll Along", "I Must Be Dreaming", "Time to Go", "This Is the End", "Whoever She Is", "Count'Em, One, Two, Three", "Kiss and Sell", "You Left Me", and "We'll All Be..." at SOMD Studios in Beltsville, Maryland, while Chris Lord-Alge mixed "Everything I Ask For", "Girls Do What They Want", and "Into Your Arms" at Resonate Music in Burbank, California. Ted Jensen mastered the album at Sterling Sound in New York City.

Release
On May 18, 2008, Can't Stop Won't Stop was announced for release, and the album's track listing and artwork was revealed. Also in May, the group went on a US tour alongside Metro Station, Forever the Sickest Kids, The Cab and Danger Radio. "Everything I Ask For" was made available for streaming via the group's Myspace account on June 3. It was made available for download via iTunes on June 10, 2008. Despite not being released as a single, the song peaked at number 19 on the Billboard Bubbling Under Hot 100 chart. On June 20, "Girls Do What They Want" was made available for streaming on the band's iLike page. From late June to mid-July, the band went on the 2008 edition of Warped Tour. Can't Stop Won't Stop was released on July 8 through independent label Fearless Records. In July and August, the group supported Good Charlotte and Boys Like Girls on their Soundtrack of Your Summer tour across the US. The group re-joined Warped Tour until mid-August. In October and November, the group went on The Compromising of Integrity, Morality & Principles in Exchange for Money tour, supporting All Time Low.

On November 19, the music video for "Everything I Ask For" premiered on various MTV channels, directed by Matthew Stawski. In February and March 2009, the band supported We the Kings on their US tour, dubbed The Secret Valentine Tour. On March 10, the band released a music video for "Girls Do What They Want" through Myspace. The video, which was filmed during the group's tours with All Time Low and We the Kings, features the band in their van, playing shows, and hanging out with fans. Director Dan Fussellman said he wanted to "tell a story out of their travel experiences from head-banging thirteen hour van rides, to pre-show chants." From late March to early May, the band co-headlined the Alternative Press Tour with 3OH!3, with support from Family Force 5, Hit the Lights and A Rocket to the Moon. In late March, the band performed at the Alternative Press party at South by Southwest festival.

The band appeared at The Bamboozle festival in early May. On June 15, "Into Your Arms" was released as a radio single. From late June to mid-August, the group went on the 2009 edition of Warped Tour. A deluxe edition of Can't Stop Won't Stop was released on July 14 through iTunes. It included three bonus tracks: a Back Ted-N-Ted remix of "The Way We Talk", a cover of the Def Leppard track "Pour Some Sugar on Me" and an acoustic version of "I Must Be Dreaming", the music videos for "Everything I Ask For" and "Girls Do What They Want", as well as the documentary "In Person". On July 27, a music video was released for "Into Your Arms". The video was directed by Aaron Platt and shot at the Ontario International Airport in Ontario, California. In October and November, the group supported Boys Like Girls on their tour of the US.

Reception

Can't Stop Won't Stop was met with mixed to positive reviews. Eric Schneider of AllMusic gave the album a positive review stating, "the ensemble excels at catchy, fast-paced pop tunes about girls and, well, more girls. Highlights include the soaring 'Everything I Ask For' and the swooning 'I Must Be Dreaming'." Blake Solomon of AbsolutePunk also gave the album a positive review. He stated, "Americans young and old will buy and enjoy this compact disc. At first they’ll criticize it for being juvenile, and then they’ll realize there’s no such thing." However, Bryan Kremkau of Read Junk gave the album a negative review criticizing it for being "too generic and radio friendly."

The album sold 12,000 copies in its first week of release. The album has sold over 100,000 copies up to date.

Track listing
All lyrics written by the Maine, all music written by the Maine, except "Count'Em, One, Two, Three" by the Maine, Ryan Osteman, and Alex Ross.

Personnel
Personnel per booklet.

The Maine
 John O'Callaghan – lead vocals
 Garrett Nickelsen – bass guitar
 Pat Kirch – drums
 Kennedy Brock – guitar, backing vocals
 Jared Monaco – guitar

Production and design
 Matt Squire – producer, engineer, mixing
 Chris Lord-Alge – mixing
 Ted Jensen – mastering
 Evan Hunt – band photography
 Jimmy Richards – art direction, design

Charts

References

External links

Can't Stop Won't Stop at YouTube (streamed copy where licensed)

The Maine (band) albums
2008 albums
Fearless Records albums
Albums produced by Matt Squire